AHED (formally AHED Music Corporation, Ltd.) was a Canadian company owned by Phil G. Anderson that produced guitar amplifiers, as well as guitars. Its main product line was the GBX amplifier, which could reach 180 watts with 4x10", 4x12" or 2x15" speakers. The GBX amplifier had a pre-amplifier that could change the gain, brilliance, depth, contour and response of the output.

AHED, an acronym for Arc Home Entertainment Diversified, was established in 1969. Anderson's earlier holding company, ARC 
Sound and its Arc Records subsidiary, became part of AHED in the early 1970s. AHED shortened its formal name to AHED Corporation in 1978, then became Eco Corporation.

In 1979, The Vannelli Brothers were using a GBX amplifier to mix their keyboards.  AHED Music Corporation also had their GBX amplification products endorsed by the popular 70's rock/jazz fusion group Lighthouse.  A poster advertising GBX that was distributed in 1973-74 read:  "LIGHTHOUSE, A super group for many years.  Their equipment requirements: versatility, reliability, portability and serviceability - they found all of these in GBX.  The equipment that takes over when other amps quit.  GBX"

GBX amplifier

The GBX series was a concept created by Guy Beresford, (now with Yorkville Sound) the domed-headed madman who inhabited the basement of Kalua Music on Kingston Road in Scarborough. His family owned the store and he worked at the rental and repair shop in the basement. Legend has it he designed the circuitry based on the idea that the head should be the pre-amp and the cabinet should carry the secondary amp and the power. The idea is you could scale up your power according to need since the cabinets would stack, driven by the four outputs of 0.5 watts from the head. Thus you could have four 140 watt cabinets pushing a total 560 watts.

GBX is said to stand for Guy Beresford Experimental.

The detailed history behind the GBX guitar amplifier began in 1968 and is in reality the original thought of musician Jim Garrett and engineer Adrian Ball. The objective was to make a solid state amplifier sound like the warm tube sound of Fender and Marshall amplifiers. The secret behind the GBX sound was a coupling transformer separating the front end from the output transistors. Guy Beresford did not get involved until 1971

The guitar series offered different configurations.

The Reverb Bug was a 1x12" Solid State combo offering 2 channels (Clean, Effect).  It featured the same gain and tone controls as the GBX Driver which will be discussed further below. The Celestion logo on the front of the grill meant that this amp featured one 25 watt Celestion G12M speaker, also known as a "green back", one of the most highly sought after guitar speakers from the late 60's early 70's.  These speakers were best known for their use in Marshall 4 X 12 100 watt cabinets.

The Super Bug was a 2x12" Solid State Amplifier, much like the Reverb Bug but more powerful and heavier to transport.

Later on GBX produced the Custom Bug which was a 60 watt solid state combo with 4 x 10" speakers.  Like the other amplifiers it had two inputs, normal and effects, and gain, brilliance, depth. contour and reverb controls.

GBX also built 4x10" and 4x12" cabinets for guitars with the rear-mounted power amplifiers.  The power amplifiers did not have volume or tone controls. They were meant for use with the matching GBX Driver preamp. In cases were the 4 x 12 cabinet had a Celestion logo on the grill the cabs contained Celestion G12M "green backs". Having the driver separate from the powered speaker cabinet gave the opportunity to add a volume pedal, or mixer pedal, or any other loop effect in between the two.  Normally turning up the driver gain would result in decibel levels too high for some situations, but with a volume pedal the high gain tones of the amp could be enjoyed at lower levels.  
 
The GBX Driver was a preamp or head that had an effect input, a normal input, a gain control, 3 tone controls labelled brilliance, depth and presence, and a 5 position response dial with dramatic contrasts between the A, B, C, D and E pre-set tone positions.  The effect channel produced more overdrive and the normal channel produced cleaner tones.  The driver had 4 outputs which made it possible to drive 4 GBX powered speaker enclosures at once. GBX also produced drivers for guitar that in addition to all the usual gain and tone controls had reverb. These were slightly taller to accommodate the reverb tank.

Bass series were known as the 'Bass Bug' with a single 15 inch speaker. 
They also made 4x10", 8x10" and 2x15" enclosures for bass as well as a matching driver. There may have been other series but it's not clear since most of the history has been lost in time.

In the back of each cabinet was a power amp which was interchangeable with a unit that ranged from 90 to 140 watts (and probably some lower wattages). The head, a small, black and blue unit with a variety of channels for sounds, a single input and an effect input, was either designated for guitar or bass. It had four outputs on the back which fed the secondary, power amplifiers. It made the cabinets very heavy but the heads, conversely were incredibly light.

The GBX line of solid state amplifiers contained quality components which included Hammond transformers,  USA made accutronics long reverb tanks and in some cases Celestion speakers.  Though they are now somewhat rare, many of these amplifiers are still in use today (2014).

The following is a fairly complete list of model numbers found on GBX power amps, combos and drivers:
GBX 2153BS Powered Speaker (2 x 15 inch speakers for bass),
GBX 4103BS Powered Speaker (4 X 10 inch speakers for bass),
GBX 4103GS Powered Speaker (4 X 10 inch speakers for guitar),
GBX 4123GS Powered Speaker (4 X 12 inch speakers for guitar),
GBX BD1 Bass Driver Preamp, 
GBX GD1 Guitar Driver Preamp, 
GBX GD2 Reverb Guitar Driver Preamp,
GBX 112GSC Reverb Bug Guitar Combo (1 X 12 inch speaker), 
GBX Bass Bug Amplifier (1 X 15 inch speaker),
GBX Custom Bug Amplifier (60watt) (4 X 10 inch speakers for guitar,)
GBX Floor Bass Bass Pedals

Note: in the late 70's GBX went into bankruptcy and the company, product lines plans and materials and balance of stock was purchased by Jules Lessard owner of Jules Lessard Musique in Quebec QC. Which had been the local reseller and supporter of the GBX line.A shop was set up in the basement of the store housed in a converted church and the production of the amplifiers and cabinets continued for a few years. During that time some R&D took place and few changes were made to the product line including a new look. There were also some improvements made to the amplifiers notably the reduction of the operating hum. All the amplifiers, preamps and cabinets were assembled by hand with point to point wiring and thong and groove cabinet construction.

Taurus Bass Head

Another model designed by AHED was the Taurus Bass amp head. This model had an orange/neon face plate with volume, treble, presence and bass controls. It had two equal impedance inputs and produced 70 watts, enabling it to power external speaker cabinets. The Taurus head came with matching cabinet, although specifics are currently unknown.

The head allowed the user to virtually exclude either extreme highs or lows through its controls, and produced its best tone in the low-mids.

Darius Guitar Head

Another model designed by AHED was the Darius Guitar amp head.  This model had a lime/neon green faceplate with volume, tone, tremolo depth, tremolo rate and reverb controls.  It had two equal impedance inputs and produced 30 watts to power an external speaker cabinet. The tone "breaks up" as the volume is increased.  The reverb is very "wet" at maximum setting.  These amplifiers used Hammond transformers.

Guitars

AHED also produced some guitars. An example was the "Magenta," which was a hand-made classical guitar featuring a solid top and bone nut.
tu57

References

Guitar amplifier manufacturers
Defunct manufacturing companies of Canada
Audio equipment manufacturers of Canada